The list of shipwrecks in May 1830 includes ships sunk, foundered, grounded, or otherwise lost during May 1830.

3 May

5 May

7 May

9 May

10 May

13 May

14 May

15 May

17 May

18 May

20 May

22 May

24 May

28 May

31 May

Unknown date

References

1830-05